William Cogan may refer to:

William H. F. Cogan (1823–1894), Irish politician
William N. Cogan (1856–1943), American dentist, educator, and naval officer